The Katzmann Report (or the Final Report by Katzmann) is one of the most important testimonies relating to the Holocaust in Poland and the extermination of Polish Jews during World War II. It was used as evidence in the Nuremberg Trials (USA No. L-18, Exhibit-277) and numerous other proceedings against war criminals abroad. It is a leather-bound report by SS-Gruppenführer Fritz Katzmann, German SS and Police Leader (SSPF) in the District of Galicia, entitled "Lösung der Judenfrage im Distrikt Galizien" (The Solution of the Jewish Question in the District of Galicia), submitted on June 30, 1943 to his superior officer, the Higher SS and Police Leader (HSSPF) "Ost" (East), SS-Obergruppenführer Friedrich-Wilhelm Krüger. It describes part of Operation Reinhard.

The Katzmann Report was published in German and illustrated with photographs of the systems of persecution. A Polish translation of the report was published in the 1950s, but was subject to communist censorship and it did not have an accompanying scholarly analysis; that came with a more recent edition by the Institute of National Remembrance. A full uncensored text of the report was published in 2009.

Report as an artifact
Modern historians consider the report to be of limited value in terms of evidence because of its intentional distortion of some facts, meant to cover up the wholesale theft of gold and money by various German officials. The 62-page book attempts to present the extermination of Jews as an orderly operation. It begins with a photo collection titled "The Solution of the Jewish Problem in East Galicia", which is followed by a cost–benefit analysis. The report provides only a window into the scale of plunder. The totals are never rounded off. They are meant to lead the reader into believing in their authenticity.

The Katzmann Report was written not in the occupied territories but in Berlin after Katzmann's tour of duty in the District of Galicia where he personally directed the murder of between 55,000 and 65,000 Jews during 1941-1942 around Lemberg. In the following months, his "Jew hunts" coupled with roundups for mass deportations to death camps produced a death toll of 143,000 people. In all, the report described the murder of 434,329 Jews, implementing a thoroughly sanitized and approved language based on popular "racial science" of Adolf Hitler and his "experts", so as to help Katzmann advance his career.

See also

 Jäger Report, 1941
 Einsatzgruppen reports, 1941–1942
 Wilhelm Cornides Report, 1942
 Wannsee Conference, 1942
 Korherr Report, 1943
 Gerstein Report, 1945
 Riegner Telegram, 1942
 Höfle Telegram, 1943

References

 Fritz Katzmann, "Rozwiązanie kwestii żydowskiej w dystrykcie Galicja", Instytut Pamięci Narodowej 2009, 
 Dariusz Libionka "AKCJA REINHARDT -Zagłada Żydów w Generalnym Gubernatorstwie", Warszawa, 2004, wydanie I, Instytut Pamięci Narodowej, 
 Institute of National Remembrance, Extermination of Jews by Nazis in the Polish Territories Research Programme, last accessed on 25 April 2007
 Institute of National Remembrance, Solving the Jewish Question in the District of Galicia publication, last accessed on 25 April 2007
 The Katzmann Report. Excerpt in English YadVashem.org
 Sara Neshamith, Galicia District JewishGen.org

Holocaust historical documents
Jewish Polish history
1943 in Europe
Operation Reinhard
1943 documents